Fulvimonas  is a genus of bacteria from the family of Rhodanobacteraceae.

References

Further reading 
 

Xanthomonadales
Bacteria genera